Elicia Marshall (born September 3, 1979) is a former synchronized swimmer from the United States. 

Elicia competed in the women's team event at the 2000 Summer Olympics, finishing in fifth place.

References 

1979 births
Living people
American synchronized swimmers
Olympic synchronized swimmers of the United States
Synchronized swimmers at the 2000 Summer Olympics
World Aquatics Championships medalists in synchronised swimming